Kukutnica (Serbian Cyrillic: Кукутница) is a mountain in western Serbia, near the town of Arilje. Its highest peak has an elevation of 1,382 meters above sea level.

References

Mountains of Serbia